Laura Davis or Davies may refer to:

 Laura Davis (swimmer) (born 1984), American female medley swimmer
 Laura Davis (volleyball) (born 1973), American volleyball player
 Laura Davis, a character in Three Moons Over Milford
 Laura Davies (born 1963), English golfer
 Laura Davies (bodybuilder) (born 1960), Canadian bodybuilder